Maybrat Regency is a regency of Southwest Papua Province of Indonesia. The administrative centre is the town of Kumurkek. The Maybrat language is spoken in the regency.

Geography
Maybrat Regency is located in the western part of Papua Island. Geographically, Maybrat Regency is
position 131º 421 0” east longitude - 132º 581 12” east and 0º 55' 12” south longitude - 2º 17' 24” south longitude. Maybrat . County
border area: to the north is bordered by Fef District, Senopi District and Kebar District; 
to the east is bordered by North Moskona District and South Moskona District;
to the south it is bordered by Kokoda District and Kais District;
in the west it is bordered by Moswaren District, Wayer District and Sawiat District;

Administrative Districts
At the 2010 Census, the Maybrat Regency comprised eleven districts (distrik), tabulated below with their areas and their populations at the 2010 Census. In 2013 thirteen additional districts were formed by division from the existing districts; these are included below, together with the populations at the 2020 Census of all twenty-four current districts. The table also includes the location of the district administrative centres, the numbers of administrative villages (rural desa and urban kelurahan) in each of the districts, and their post codes.

Notes:(a) The area and 2010 Census population of what is now Ayamaru Selatan Jaya District are included in the total figures for Aitinyo Barat District, from which it was divided.
(b) The area and 2010 Census population of what is now Aitinyo Tengah District are included in the total figures for Aitinyo District, from which it was divided.
(c) The area and 2010 Census population of what is now Aifat Timur Selatan District are included in the total figures for Aifat Selatan District, from which it was divided.
(d) The area and 2010 Census population of what is now Aitinyo Raya District are included in the total figures for Aitinyo Utara District, from which it was divided.
(e) The area and 2010 Census population of what is now Ayamaru Timur Selatan District are included in the total figures for Ayamaru Timur District, from which it was divided.
(f) The areas and 2010 Census populations of what are now Ayamaru Selatan, Ayamaru Jaya, Ayamaru Tengah and Ayamaru Barat Districts are included in the total figures for Ayamaru District, from which they were all divided.
(g) The area and 2010 Census population of what is now Ayamaru Utara Timur District are included in the total figures for Ayamaru Utara District, from which it was divided.
(h) The area and 2010 Census population of what is now Mare Selatan District are included in the total figures for Mare District, from which it was divided.
(j) The areas and 2010 Census populations of what are now Aifat Timur Tengah and Aifat Timur Jauh Districts are included in the total figures for Aifat Timur District, from which they were both divided.

Climate
Kumurkek has a tropical rainforest climate (Af) with heavy to very heavy rainfall year-round.

References

External links
Statistics publications from Statistics Indonesia (BPS)

Regencies of Southwest Papua